Men's Downhill World Cup 1978/1979

Final point standings

In Men's Downhill World Cup 1978/79 the best 5 results count. Seven racers had a point deduction, which are given in "()" (brackets).

References
 fis-ski.com

External links
 

World Cup
FIS Alpine Ski World Cup men's downhill discipline titles